The 1973–74 Michigan State Spartans men's basketball team represented Michigan State University in the 1973–74 NCAA Division I men's basketball season as members of the Big Ten Conference. They played their home games at Jenison Fieldhouse in East Lansing, Michigan and were coached by Gus Ganakas in his fifth year as head coach of the Spartans. MSU finished the season 13–11, 8–6 in Big Ten play to finish in a tie for fourth place.

Previous season 
The Spartans finished the 1972–73 season 13–11, 6–8 in Big Ten play to finish in a tie for sixth place.

Roster and statistics 

Source

Schedule and results 

|-
!colspan=9 style=| Regular season

Awards and honors
 Lindsay Hairston – All-Big Ten First Team
 Mike Robinson – All-Big Ten First Team

See also
 1974 in Michigan

References 

Michigan State Spartans men's basketball seasons
Michigan State
Michigan State Spartans men's basketball
Michigan